The Proof and Experimental Test Establishment (or PETE) is a Canadian Forces military weapons testing facility located West of Nicolet, Quebec on the shore of Lac Saint-Pierre.

References 

Canadian Forces bases in Quebec